Foreign accent may refer to:
accent (sociolinguistics)
diacritic, an accent mark in writing
non-native pronunciations of English
Anglophone pronunciation of foreign languages
foreign accent syndrome